Lomanotus genei is a species of a sea slug, a marine gastropod mollusk in the family Lomanotidae.

Distribution 
This species was described from Genoa in the Adriatic Sea. It has been reported from Atlantic coasts north to the United Kingdom.

Ecology 
Parasites of Lomanotus genei include:
 Copepod Lomanoticola insolens - ectoparasite

References

External links 

 Lomanotus genei Verany, 1846 at Sea Slug Forum
 

Lomanotidae
Gastropods described in 1846